"A Swingin' Safari" is a 1962 instrumental composed by Bert Kaempfert, using his alias, Bernd Bertie. It was recorded by Kaempfert on Polydor Records and released in the United States on Decca Records. The song features a distinctive main theme played on the piccolo as substitute for the traditional tin whistle, and a trumpet solo by Manfred "Fred" Moch. The prominent bass line is by Ladi Geisler. Kaempfert's recording of the song did not reach the charts, but a near-simultaneous cover by Billy Vaughn reached #13 on the U.S. Billboard Hot 100 and No. 5 on the Easy Listening chart.

Similarities to "The Lion Sleeps Tonight" 
"A Swingin' Safari" shares a number of compositional elements in common with The Tokens' 1961 hit "The Lion Sleeps Tonight," which itself was derived from several earlier arrangements of Solomon Linda's 1939 song "Mbube". In particular, "A Swingin' Safari" uses the chord changes, tempo, shuffle rhythm, and high soprano obbligato of the Tokens' hit, and the tin whistle theme that opens the arrangement rhythmically mimics the "wimoweh" vocal figure found in the Weavers' 1952 "Wimoweh" recording and the Tokens' version. Kaempfert's own recording of "Wimoweh" appears on the album, credited to "Paul Campbell" which is a pseudonym for the members of The Weavers.

A Swingin' Safari (album) 
The song was the title track of an LP consisting of orchestrations of the South African kwela style of penny-whistle music popular in the 1950s. The album was credited to "Bert Kaempfert and His Orchestra".

This album was first released in the U.S. in August 1962 under the title That Happy Feeling and had climbed to Number 14 in the charts by September of that year. It was then released on the European market with the title A Swingin' Safari in autumn of the same year.

Tracklist
The tracklist for the album was:

"A Swingin' Safari" – Written by Bert Kaempfert (3:06)
"That Happy Feeling" – Written by Guy Warren (2:54)
"Market Day" – Written by Kaempfert (2:31)
"Take Me" – Written by Kaempfert and Helmut Brüsewitz (3:01)
"Similau" – Written by Arden Clar and Harry Coleman (2:56)
"Zambesi" – Written by Anton de Waal, Bob Hilliard & Nico Carstens (2:48)
"Afrikaan Beat" – Written by Kaempfert (2:26)
"Happy Trumpeter" – Written by Kaempfert (2:37)
"Tootie Flutie" – Written by Kaempfert (2:09)
"Wimoweh" – Written by Paul Campbell & Roy Ilene (2:41)
"Black Beauty" – Written by Kaempfert & Cedric Dumont (2:34)
"Skokiaan" – Written by August Msarurgwa & Tom Glazer (2:49)

Certifications

Billy Vaughn version
In 1962, the same year as the release of the original, Billy Vaughn recorded the song "A Swingin' Safari" as a cover; his version reached #13 on the U.S. Billboard Hot 100 and No. 5 on the Easy Listening chart that summer.  On Cash Box, the song peaked at No. 11.

Use in media
The Bert Kaempfert version of "A Swingin' Safari" served as the original theme music to the television game show The Match Game, from 1962 to 1967. 
The Kaempfert version is also featured as the main theme in the Swedish game show called Vi i femman, where two teams of fifth-graders compete against each other. 
In 1971, the song was used as the theme music to the Blue Peter Royal Safari.
In 2009, the song was played over the closing credits of the Australian animated film Mary and Max.
In 2017, the song was used extensively by the European furniture retailer DFS, in both TV and radio advertising campaigns. 
In 2018, it lent its title to the Australian comedy film Swinging Safari, set in the 1970s. The track featured in the soundtrack, and the album cover was seen on screen when a character showed off his collection of popular LPs.

References

External links

 Allmusic.com entry for A Swingin' Safari (1998 re-release)

1962 singles
1960s instrumentals
Television game show theme songs
Songs with music by Bert Kaempfert
Songs written for films
1962 songs
Polydor Records singles
Decca Records singles